Lionel De Haes was a Belgian weightlifter. He competed in the men's featherweight event at the 1920 Summer Olympics.

References

External links
 

Year of birth missing
Year of death missing
Belgian male weightlifters
Olympic weightlifters of Belgium
Weightlifters at the 1920 Summer Olympics
Place of birth missing